Frederick, Frederic or Fred Smith may refer to:

In literature
Frederick Smith, 2nd Earl of Birkenhead (1907–1975), British peer and biographer
Frederick Smith, 3rd Earl of Birkenhead (1936–1985), British peer and author
Frederick E. Smith (1919–2012), British author
Frederick M. Smith (1874–1946), American religious leader and author

In music
Frederic Jacobs Smith (1882–1932), co-founder of Carrie Jacobs-Bond & Son
Fred Sledge Smith (1933–2005), American R&B songwriter and record producer
Fred Smith (bassist) (born 1948), American bass guitarist best known for his work with Blondie and Television
Fred "Sonic" Smith (1948–1994), American guitarist with the MC5
Iain Campbell Smith or Fred Smith, Australian folk singer/songwriter and comedian

In politics
F. E. Smith, 1st Earl of Birkenhead (Frederick Edwin Smith, 1872–1930), British Conservative statesman; Attorney-General, Lord Chancellor
Fred Smith (Arkansas politician), former professional basketball player and member of the Arkansas House of Representatives
Fred Smith (New Brunswick politician) (1871–1941), Member of the Legislative Assembly of New Brunswick
Fred Smith (North Carolina politician) (born 1942), American politician; North Carolina legislator and attorney
Fred J. Smith (fl. 1965), member of the 74th Illinois General Assembly
Fred L. Smith (political writer), American think-tank leader
Frederick Smith, 2nd Viscount Hambleden (1868–1928), British MP
Frederick Smith (Australian politician) (1883–1960), Australian politician, government minister in Western Australia
Frederick Smith (barrister) (1924–2016), Attorney General of Barbados and Chief Justice of Turks and Caicos
Frederick Smith (lawyer) (1773–1830), Pennsylvania lawyer, state Attorney General, state Supreme Court Justice
Frederick Chatfield Smith (1823–1905), British Member of Parliament for North Nottinghamshire, 1868–1880
Frederick Cleveland Smith (1884–1956), U. S. Representative from Ohio
Fred Smith, program director at Maryville Academy and candidate in the United States House of Representatives elections in Illinois, 2010
Sir Frederick Smith (British Army officer, born 1790) (1790–1874), British general and colonel-commandant of the Royal Engineers, and Conservative MP for Chatham

In sports

Association football 
Fred Smith (Port Vale footballer), English football player at outside left with Port Vale in the 1920s
Fred Smith (footballer, born 1887) (1887–1957), English football player with Stockport County, Derby County, Macclesfield and Southampton in the 1900s and 1910s
Fred Smith (footballer, born 1898) (1898–1971), English football player with Bury
Fred Smith (footballer, born 1901) (1901–?), English football centre forward
Frederick Smith (footballer), English football player at outside right with Stockport County, Darlington, Exeter City and Gillingham in the 1930s
Fred Smith (footballer, born 1914) (1914–1982), English football player with Bury and Bradford
Fred Smith (footballer, born February 1926) (1926–2005), Scottish footballer with Aberdeen, Hull City, Sheffield United and Millwall
Fred Smith (footballer, born May 1926) (1926–2017), English football player with Sheffield United and Grimsby
Fred Smith (footballer, born 1942) (1942-2020), English football player with Burnley and Portsmouth

Baseball 
Fred Smith (1890s pitcher) (1865–1926), American Major League Baseball pitcher
Fred Smith (1900s pitcher) (1878–1964), American Major League Baseball pitcher
Fred Smith (infielder) (1891–1961), American Major League Baseball infielder

Cricket 
Fred Smith (cricketer, born 1879) (1879–1905), English cricketer for Yorkshire
Fred Smith (cricketer, born 1885) (1885–?), English cricketer for Yorkshire
Fred Smith (South African cricketer) (1861–1914), South African Test cricketer
Frederick Smith (Somerset cricketer) (1854–1894), English cricketer
Frederick Smith (Barbadian cricketer) (1837-1923), Barbadian cricketer

Others 
Fred Smith (rugby league, born c. 1885), English rugby league footballer of the 1900s and 1910s for Great Britain, England, and Hunslet
Fred Smith (rugby league, born 1935) (1935–2004), English rugby league footballer of the 1950s and 1960s for Yorkshire, Leeds, and Wakefield Trinity
Fred Smith (rugby league, 1930s), rugby league centre who played in the 1930s for Wakefield Trinity
Fred Smith, skateboarder for the Z-Boys Alva team
Fred A. Smith (jockey) (died 1951), Cuban-American jockey
Fred L. Smith (coach), former Illinois and Fordham football coach
Jonathan Smith (wide receiver) (born 1981), nicknamed "Fast Freddie", American football player
Fred Smith (snooker player), billiards and snooker player
Fred Smith (Australian footballer) (born 1941), Australian rules footballer

In other fields
Fred A. Smith (trade unionist) (1887–1943), British trade unionist
Fred E. Smith (1873–1918), Medal of Honor recipient
Freddie Smith (born 1988), American television actor
Frederic H. Smith Jr. (1908–1980), United States Air Force general
Frederick Smith (entomologist) (1805–1879), British entomologist
Frederick Augustus Smith (1826–1887), Irish recipient of the VC
Frederick W. Smith (born 1944), American businessman; founder of FedEx
Frederick W. Smith (physician) (1858–1917), Health Commissioner in Syracuse, New York
Frederic L. Smith (1870–1954), American football player and automobile industry pioneer in Detroit, Michigan
Frederick Smith, 1st Baron Colwyn (1859–1946), British businessman
Frederick Appleton Smith (1849–1922), U.S. Army general
Frederick Smith, 2nd Baron Colwyn (1914–1966), stockbroker and British Army officer
Frederick Porter Smith (1833–1888), British medical missionary to China
Fredrick George Smith (1872–1956), British mechanical engineer
Frederick Viggers Smith (1912–2006), Australian/British psychologist
Frederick Y. Smith (1903–1991), American film editor
G. Frederick Smith (1891–1976), American chemist

See also
Frederick Smyth (disambiguation)